Kjelsås Station is located at Kjelsås in Oslo, Norway on the Gjøvik Line.

The station is served by commuter and regional trains operated by Vy Gjøvikbanen. There is a tram and bus stop at the station. The station is located beside the Norwegian Museum of Science and Technology.

Kjelsås tram stop

Kjelsås is also the name of a tram stop and it is the terminus of the Kjelsås Line. It is served by line 11 and 12 using the older SL79 high-floor trams. It has a balloon loop. It was opened on the 25 of September, 1934 along with the rest of the Kjelsås Line. Kjelsås was closed for two years along with the rest of the Kjelsås Line from 2002 until 2004 after local protest. In the 2010s, the Kjelsås Line was upgraded as part of the Fremtidens Byreise programme (this brings 87 new trams to Oslo). The balloon loop surrounds a former depot that was taken out of use in 1957, when the Grefsen depot was established. The depot was designed by Carl Vorbeck and it could hold 4-5 carriages within it. It is now in use as a cultural centre.

References

External links 
  Entry at Jernbaneverket <

Railway stations in Oslo
Railway stations on the Gjøvik Line
Railway stations opened in 1900
1900 establishments in Norway